James Lewin McGregor (May 31, 1921, Crawford Bay, British Columbia – January 3, 1988, Mountain View, California) was a mathematician who introduced Karlin–McGregor polynomials.

A native of Canada he served in the Canadian military during World War II. He received his undergrad degree from the University of British Columbia. He received his PhD from Cal Tech and then became a professor of mathematics at Stanford University.

References

External links
 Memorial resolution
 

1921 births
1988 deaths
Stanford University faculty
California Institute of Technology alumni
Canadian military personnel of World War II
20th-century Canadian mathematicians
Canadian expatriates in the United States